PACIFICITY is an integrated development located in the area of Likas, Kota Kinabalu, Sabah, Malaysia featuring residences, offices, hotels and a shopping mall. PACIFICITY is accessible from 3 surrounding roads connected by 6-entry and exit points and 15 mins to Kota Kinabalu International Airport. The previous estimated completion date for this project is on 2018, but then postponed to 2023.

References 

Buildings and structures in Kota Kinabalu